The following are the records of Nicaragua in Olympic weightlifting. Records are maintained in each weight class for the snatch lift, clean and jerk lift, and the total for both lifts by the Federacion Nicaraguense de Levantamiento de Pesas.

Men

Women

References

Nicaragua
Olympic weightlifting
weightlifting